Zygo Corporation, or simply Zygo, is a manufacturer headquartered at Middlefield, Connecticut that specializes in optical systems and equipment. Their metrology product lines include 3D measuring microscopes using coherence scanning interferometry, laser Fizeau interferometers for testing optical components, laser displacement interferometers, and heterodyne optical encoders for stage position metrology. Zygo’s optics business manufactures both optical assembly and custom optics for medical instruments and national labs. Over 750 patents have been awarded since the Company's founding.

In October 2008, competitor ESI attempted to acquire Zygo for  approximately 174 million USD worth of stock but the buy-out was stymied by Zygo's board of directors. Zygo later became part of the Ultra Precision Technologies Division of Ametek, Inc. as a result of a 2014 acquisition.

History and products

The company was founded in 1970 by Paul Forman, Carl Zanoni, and Sol Laufer, with financial support from Canon Inc. and Wesleyan University. An initial priority for the Company was to build a world-class optical fabrication facility for producing optics with the highest precision plano surfaces and angles.

It was recognized that in order to achieve such a goal, practical and easy-to-use interferometry would have to be a standard part of the fabrication process. While there were several interferometers available on the market at that time, none had all the flexibility or features needed for Zygo’s facilities and were also extremely cost-prohibitive. An interferometer was developed in 1974 for these in-house purposes, the Model GH, and it later became Zygo’s first commercial product with a second model, the Mark II, being its breakout success.

In the 1990s, Zygo expanded its offerings to include software designed for lower cost personal computers and brought to market its ZMI metrology lasers.

Awards and accolades 
Two researchers working received the Rudolf Kinglake Medal for their work while employed at Zygo in optical engineering in 2016. 

In 2000, Zygo successfully sued Wyko Corp for patent infringement of a breadboard-based interferometer first registered by Zygo in 1978.

References

External links 
Official Twitter
Selected technical papers
Microsoft Academic Profile

Middletown, Connecticut
Companies based in Middlesex County, Connecticut
Instrument-making corporations
2014 mergers and acquisitions